Iker Alday Igartua (born 23 June 2003) is a Spanish professional footballer who plays as a central defender or a midfielder for CD Vitoria.

Club career
He made his senior debut with the farm team on 5 September 2021, starting in a 0–0 Tercera División RFEF away draw against Amurrio Club.

He was called up to the first team for the 2022 pre-season by manager Gaizka Garitano, and made his professional debut on 12 February 2023, coming on as a late substitute for Matheus Pereira in a 3–0 Segunda División home loss against FC Cartagena.

References

External links
 
 

2003 births
Living people
Footballers from Getxo
Spanish footballers
Association football defenders
Association football midfielders
Segunda División players
Tercera Federación players
CD Vitoria footballers
SD Eibar footballers